The Ethiopian–Somali conflict is a territorial and political dispute between the countries of Ethiopia and Somalia. Lasting from the late 1940s, when the Ogaden region was handed back over to Ethiopia by the British, into the present day, the tensions culminated in three wars and numerous military clashes alongside the borders. However, because of the Somali Civil War and the lack of a functioning central government in Somalia since the collapse of the Democratic Republic of Somalia in 1991, Ethiopia has the upper hand militarily and economically.

Background 

In the 14th and 15th century the rulers of the Christian Ethiopian highlands had become increasingly more interested in proselytizing the overwhelmingly Muslim inhabited land of what is presently northern Somalia, in large part to achieve sea access. Abyssinian military expeditions were dispatched south-eastward from the highlands over the decades and were a significant unifying force among the Somali and other Muslim nationalities in the region. According to Professor Richard Greenfields, "In the 16th century the number and size of Abyssinian raiding parties, and consequent plunder and destruction, was on the increase. Eventually, the harassed Somali people retaliated."

During the 16th century, Imam Ahmad ibn Ibrahim al-Ghazi (Ahmad Gurey or Gragn) led a Conquest of Abyssinia (Futuh al-Habash), which brought three-quarters of the Christian polity under the power of the Muslim Adal Sultanate. With an army mainly composed of Somalis, Al-Ghazi's forces and their Ottoman allies came close to extinguishing the ancient Ethiopian kingdom. However, the Ethiopians managed to secure the assistance of Cristóvão da Gama's Portuguese troops and maintain their domain's autonomy. Both polities in the process exhausted their resources and manpower, which resulted in the contraction of both powers and changed regional dynamics for centuries to come. Many historians trace the origins of hostility between Somalia and Ethiopia to this war. Some scholars also argue that this conflict proved, through their use on both sides, the value of firearms such as the matchlock musket, cannons and the arquebus over traditional weapons.

In the 19th century, the Ethiopian King Menelik II invaded the Somali-inhabited The Huwan region, which was gradually conquered in spite of pressure from local Huwan chiefs and Diiriye Guure and his Emir of the Dervish State. Diiriye Guure's polity eventually collapsed a quarter of a century later in 1920, following heavy British aerial bombardment.

Modern conflict

1948–1982 
In 1948, under pressure from their World War II allies and to the dismay of the Somalis, the British "returned" the Haud (an important Somali grazing area that was presumably protected by British treaties with the Somalis in 1884 and 1886), the Reserve area and the Ogaden to Ethiopia, based on a treaty they signed in 1897 in which the British ceded Somali territory to the Ethiopian Emperor Menelik in exchange for his help against raids by Somali clans. Britain included a clause that the Somali residents would retain their autonomy, but Ethiopia immediately claimed sovereignty over the area. This prompted an unsuccessful bid by Britain in 1956 to buy back the Somali lands it had turned over. Disgruntlement with the 1948 decision led to repeated attempts by Somali parties to re-unite the ceded Ogaden, Reserve area and Haud region with the other Somali territories in Greater Somalia. Clashes over the disputed region include:

 1964 Ethiopian–Somali Border War
 1977–1978 Ogaden War
 1982 August Border Clash
 1998–2000 cross-border warfare during the chaotic warlord-led era.

History of Ethiopian intervention (1996–2003) 
The first incursion by Ethiopian troops after the fall of the central Somali government took place in August 1996. In March 1999, Ethiopian troops reportedly raided the Somali border town of Balanballe in pursuit of members of the Al-Ittihad Al-Islamiya group which had been fighting to unite Ethiopia's eastern Ogaden region with Somalia. Later, in April 1999 two Somali leaders, Ali Mahdi and Hussein Aideed, said in an official protest to the United Nations Security Council, that heavily armed Ethiopian troops entered the towns of Beledhawo and Doollow on Friday, April 9, 1999. They further alleged that the Ethiopian troops had taken over the local administration and detained officials in the towns. In May 1999, Ethiopian soldiers, with the help of a pro-Ethiopian Somali faction occupied the town of Luuq in southwestern Somalia, close to the borders with Ethiopia and Kenya. In late June 1999, Ethiopian soldiers, supported by armoured vehicles launched an attack from Luuq that resulted in the capture of Garba Harre in the Gedo region, which was previously controlled by the Somali National Front led by Hussein Aideed. The attack was apparently aimed at flushing out Ethiopian rebels based in Somalia.

After the formation of the Transitional National Government (TNG) of Somalia in August 2000, Ethiopia initially did not recognize the interim government and reportedly continued its raids against Al-Ittihad and supporting various warlord factions, which led to strained relations between the Ethiopian government and the interim Somali government, characterized by accusations, denials and counter-accusations on both sides.

In January 2001, Somalia's TNG Prime Minister, Ali Khalif Galaydh, strongly accused Ethiopia of arming factions opposed to the government, occupying Somali districts and increasing its military presence in the country. He later claimed that Ethiopian soldiers had occupied towns in Somalia’s southwestern region, and had detained and intimidated its nationals; the Ethiopian government denied these charges.

Ethiopia has supported and is alleged to have supported a number of different Somali factions at one time or another. Among these are the Somali Reconstruction and Restoration Council (SRRC), Muse Sudi Yalahow, General Mohammed Said Hirsi Morgan (allied to the Somali Patriotic Movement or SPM), Hassan Mohamed Nur Shatigudud and his Rahanwein Resistance Army (RRA) and Abdullahi Yusuf Ahmed (former President of Puntland and current Somali TNG President). A number of Somali warlord factions have also held meetings and formed loose alliances in Ethiopia.

Reports in early January, 2002 indicated that around 300 Ethiopian soldiers were deployed in Garowe (capital of Puntland) with other Ethiopian troops reportedly moving into the neighbouring Bay region and around Baidoa. The Ethiopian government denied these reports and accused the interim government of spreading "malicious lies" about Ethiopia’s policy towards Somalia.

Ethiopian soldiers again attacked and temporarily captured the border town of Beledhawo on Wednesday, May 15, 2002 with the help of the SRRC after the town had been captured by a rival militia. During the raid, the commander of the rival militia, Colonel Abdirizak Issak Bihi, was captured by the Ethiopian forces and taken across the border to Ethiopia. After the raid, control of the town was turned over to the SRRC. Earlier in May, Colonel Abdullahi Yusuf Ahmed had retaken control of Puntland by ousting his rival Jama Ali Jama with the aid of the Ethiopian army.

In February 2003, Ethiopia's Prime Minister, Meles Zenawi, admitted that Ethiopian troops were occasionally sent into Somalia to battle the militant Islamist group, Al-Ittihad and stated that the group was linked to Al-Qaeda. He also claimed that Ethiopia's government had lists of Al-Ittihad members who were, at the time, in the Transitional National Government and parliament of Somalia; a claim that TNG President Abdiqasim Salad Hassan has consistently denied. President Hassan has in turn, accused Ethiopia of destabilizing Somalia, interfering daily in Somali affairs and violating the arms embargo on Somalia by supplying weapons to warlords opposed to the Transitional Government at the time; Ethiopia denied these charges.

Although an attempt was made to improve relations between Ethiopia and the TNG in June 2001, relations only really improved in 2004 when Abdullahi Yusuf became the TNG President. Ethiopia then reversed its position and began to support the interim government, especially against various Islamist militias in Somalia, most recently the Islamic Courts Union.

2006 involvement 

Ethiopian involvement in Somalia gained widespread public attention when Ethiopian troops moved into Somali territory on July 20, 2006. Somalia's interim government was then resisting advances by the Islamic Courts Union forces north to the last unoccupied city of Baidoa.

A Somali Islamist leader called for a "jihad" to drive out Ethiopian troops, after they entered the country to protect the weak interim government, however, Sharia courts in Ethiopia condemned the ICU's declaration of holy war. Meles Zenawi has agreed to withdraw Ethiopian forces at arrival of the African Union.

Later reports indicate that Ethiopian soldiers occupied Bardaale, west of Baidoa, the day after the ICU seized control of Kismayo on September 21. The Ethiopians withdrew their last troops on 17 January.

See also
 History of Somalia
 History of Ethiopia
 Ethiopian–Adal war
 Ethiopia-Somalia relations

Sources

External links 
 Timeline: Ethiopia vs Somalia (BBC)
 Somali Islamist orders 'holy war' (BBC)
 Why Ethiopia is on a war footing (BBC)
 Ethiopian Arms Embargo Violations
 Ethiopian Prime Minister Agrees to pull troops out of Somalia at AU Arrival

Military history of Somalia
Military history of Ethiopia
Military history of Africa
Modern history of Somalia
Ethiopia–Somalia relations
Wars involving the states and peoples of Africa
Wars involving Ethiopia
Wars involving Somalia
20th century in Ethiopia